Cel-Ray is a celery-flavored soft drink from Dr Brown's. It is fairly easy to find in New York City, Philadelphia, Baltimore, and in South Florida, but rather obscure elsewhere.

History
Dr. Brown's sodas are kosher, are often sold in Jewish delicatessens and restaurants, and can also be found in specialty grocers and grocery stores that specialize in American food in Israel. The flavor, derived from celery seed extract, is reminiscent of ginger ale but with a pronounced celery flavor that is more pungent or peppery than ginger ale.

Dr. Brown's Celery Tonic was, according to the company, first produced in 1868 in Brooklyn, New York. It was served in New York delicatessens starting in 1869 and sold as a bottled soda starting in 1886. The Food and Drug Administration objected to its being called a "tonic," and in the 1900s the name was changed to Dr. Brown's Cel-Ray (soda). Cel-Ray was so popular in the 1930s among New York City's Jewish community that it earned the nickname "Jewish Champagne."  Dr. Brown's briefly produced a diet Cel-Ray, but it was discontinued due to low sales. Other "celery tonics"/"celery sodas" were produced in the 1890s, but only Dr. Brown's celery product remains today.

In popular culture
Cel-Ray was mentioned in:
 the 1982 film Tootsie, not referred to as "Cel-Ray," rather "celery tonic" as the reason of what was spilled on the video tape and hence why a live performance of that day's show was required.
 the Seinfeld season eight episode "The Pothole."
 the US television show Gilmore Girls, season seven, episode five, "The Great Stink."
 the film Serpico.
 the book The Amazing Adventures of Kavalier & Clay as a favorite drink of Sammy Clay's father, the Molecule Man, or the World's Strongest Jew. 
 in the Bunheads television show episode "Blank Up, It's Time."
 the Frank Zappa and the Mothers of Invention record album, Fillmore East – June 1971. 
 the film A Chorus Line, when Cassie and Larry eat lunch.
 the book Games Wizards Play, by Diane Duane.
 the character of Billy Rose (played by James Caan) in the 1975 film Funny Lady habitually drank celery tonic, as an alternative to alcohol. 
 It was used as a plot point joining assistant Harriet Smith and senator James Elton in the web series Emma Approved, written and directed by the makers of "The Lizzie Bennet Diaries."
 in the 2008 Richard Price novel Lush Life during a witness's account of a homicide.
 in the 2010 season 5 Boardwalk Empire episode, "Cuanto", the character Mickey Doyle asks for the drink while taking a long-distance call from Cuba.
 in the 2013 Hanya Yanagihara novel The People in the Trees, "Travelers heading west to California would stop in Peet for an egg salad sandwich and a celery soda from the general store near the station before reembarking." Yanagihara includes this as a marker of distinct time and geography.
 in the 2004 novel Wake Up, Sir! by Jonathan Ames, it is the favorite drink of the narrator, the fictional writer Alan Blair.
 in the 2013 novel Bleeding Edge'' by Thomas Pynchon, it is served at "a possibly make-believe Jewish delicatessen, Bagels ’n’ Blintzes."

See also
Cuisine of New York City
Jewish cuisine
Champagne soda

References

External links
 Review at ExoticSoda.com
  A Toast to Cel-Ray at Nextbook

Products introduced in 1868
American soft drinks
Cuisine of Baltimore
Cuisine of New York City
Cuisine of Philadelphia
Florida cuisine
Jewish American cuisine
Jews and Judaism in Baltimore
Jews and Judaism in Florida
Jews and Judaism in New York City
Jews and Judaism in Philadelphia
Kosher drinks